Alan James Bulloch (born 7 July 1977) is a Scottish former rugby union player who gained five international caps at centre.

Early life
Bulloch was born on 7 July 1977 in Glasgow, Scotland. He was educated at Hutchesons' Grammar School and played for the Scottish schools team at centre.

Rugby Union career

Amateur career

He played for Glasgow Hutchesons Aloysians.

Professional career

When the game turned professional in 1996 he signed for Glasgow Rugby, now Glasgow Warriors.

As the Centre named for Warriors first match as a professional team - against Newbridge in the European Challenge Cup - Bulloch has the distinction of being given Glasgow Warrior No. 13 for the provincial side.

Two years later, Scotland's professional teams reorganised and the side was then named Glasgow Caledonians.

He retired from professional rugby in 2004 at the age of 26.

International career

He toured with Scotland in 1998 and 1999.

The last of his five caps was a Six Nations match against England at Twickenham on 3 March 2001.

Family

His brother Gordon Bulloch was also capped for Scotland.

References

1977 births
Living people
Scottish rugby union players
Scotland international rugby union players
Rugby union players from Glasgow
People educated at Hutchesons' Grammar School
West of Scotland FC players
Glasgow Warriors players
Rugby union centres